Mrkić is a surname. Notable people with the surname include:

Ivan Mrkić (born 1953), Serbian diplomat and politician
Jelena Mrkić (born 1983), Croatian-born Serbian pop singer
Jovana Mrkić (born 1994), Montenegrin footballer
Marko Mrkić (born 1996), Serbian footballer
Saša Mrkić (born 1967), Serbian football manager and former player 
Savica Mrkić (born 1991), Macedonian handball player

Serbian surnames